Étienne Alexandre Arnould Locard (8 December 1841 – 28 October 1904), usually known as Arnould Locard, was a French naturalist, malacologist and geologist.
His name can be abbreviated/spelled as Arnoul at plates, for example Crosse (1980).

Biography 
Born in Lyon, he was the son of engineer Eugene Locard. He was a student at École Centrale Paris. He is considered one of the more prolific malacologists of the so-called "new school" with Jules René Bourguignat (1828–1892) as his master.

Locard is credited with describing hundreds of zoological species, in particular freshwater mussels and gastropods from the genus Helix. During his career he did very little collecting of specimens himself, preferring to work in an institution/museum environment. In 1895, he revised the conchological collection of Jacques Philippe Raymond Draparnaud (1772–1804).

Among his many publications are articles on the geology of the Lyon region, and treatises on fossil and living mollusks. He was the author of detailed biographies of naturalists, such as Martial Étienne Mulsant (1797–1880) and Gaspard Michaud (1795–1880), and also wrote an article on Lyonnaise malacologists, titled Malacologistes lyonnais (1879). In 1877 he published Malacologie Lyonnaise; ou Description des mollusques terrestres & aquatiques des environs de Lyons (1877), based on Ange Paulin Terver's collection of terrestrial and aquatic mollusks found in the vicinity of Lyon.
In 1893 Philippe Thomas published the palaeontology results of the Tunisian Scientific Exploration Mission (1885–86) in six instalments plus an atlas, giving the work of Victor-Auguste Gauthier (sea urchins), Arnould Locard (Mollusca), Auguste Péron (Brachiopods, Bryozoa and Pentacrinitess) and Henri Émile Sauvage (fish).

Locard was a member of the Académie des sciences, belles-lettres et arts de Lyon (1879–1904), the Société française de malacologie, the Société géologique de France and the Société linnéenne de Lyon 1881–1904, president- 1882). He was a founding member of the Association lyonnaise des amis des sciences naturelles.

Principal works 
 1881-1890. Contributions à la Faune malacologique française. Ann. Soc. linn. Lyon et Ann. Soc. Hist. nat. Agric. Arts utiles Lyon. regroupant 15 mémoires.
 1884-1887. Matériaux pour servir à l'histoire de la Malacologie française. Bull. Soc. mal. Fr. Paris. regroupant 7 mémoires.
 1884. Histoire des Mollusques dans l'Antiquite.
 1888-1898. Notices conchyliologiques. L'Echange, Revue linnéenne, Lyon. rassemblant 50 mémoires.

Taxa described 
Taxa described by Arnould Locard include (sorted chronologically, gastropods and bivalves):

1882
 Cernuella aginnica (Locard, 1882)
 Helicella bolenensis (Locard, 1882)
 Chilostoma crombezi (Locard, 1882)
 Spiralix rayi (Locard, 1882)
 Urticicola isaricus (Locard, 1882)

1886
 Alvania simulans Locard, 1886
 Mitrella lanceolata (Locard, 1886)
 Nassarius ovoideus (Locard, 1886)
 Odostomia megerlei (Locard, 1886)
 Setia amabilis (Locard, 1886)

1889
 Mytilaster marioni (Locard, 1889)

1891
 Haedropleura forbesi Locard, 1891
 Pleurotomella reconditum (Locard, 1891)
 Raphitoma servaini (Locard, 1891)

1892
 Bela decussata (Locard, 1892)
 Bela oceanica (Locard, 1892)
 Bela zonata (Locard, 1892)
 Cerithiopsis scalaris (Locard, 1892)
 Emarginula tenera Locard, 1892
 Ondina crystallina Locard, 1892
 Peringiella elegans (Locard, 1892)
 Pollia scabra Locard, 1892
 Retusa candidula (Locard, 1892)

1893
 Dreissena anatolica Locard, 1893
 Dreissena gallandi Locard, 1893
 Dreissena siouffi Locard, 1893

1894
 Oxychilus colliourensis (Locard, 1894)

1896
 Calliostoma cleopatra (Locard, 1896)
 Kryptos koehleri (Locard, 1896)
 Mesalia flammifera (Locard, 1896)

1897
 Abyssochrysos eburneus (Locard, 1897)
 Amauropsis brassiculina (Locard, 1897)
 Bathybela nudator (Locard, 1897)
 Bathybela tenelluna (Locard, 1897)
 Bulla mabillei Locard, 1897
 Cadulus artatus Locard, 1897
 Cadulus monterosatoi Locard, 1897
 Clathurella salarium P. Fischer in Locard, 1897
 Coralliophila monterosatoi (Locard, 1897)
 Cylichnium africanum (Locard, 1897)
 Drilliola Locard, 1897
 Eulimella nana Locard, 1897
 Euthriostoma saharicum (Locard, 1897)
 Favartia bojadorensis (Locard, 1897)
 Fissidentalium semivestitum (Locard, 1897)
 Fusinus sectus (Locard, 1897)
 Gadila senegalensis (Locard, 1897)
 Gadila strangulata (Locard, 1897)
 Gibberula abyssicola Locard, 1897
 Granulina minusculina (Locard, 1897)
 Gregorioiscala pachya (Locard, 1897)
 Gymnobela abyssorum (Locard, 1897)
 Hexaplex saharicus (Locard, 1897)
 Inopinodon azoricus (Locard, 1897)
 Latiromitra Locard, 1897
 Latirus rugosissimus (Locard, 1897)
 Marginella marocana Locard, 1897
 Mitrella nitidulina (Locard, 1897)
 Modulus turbinoides (Locard, 1897)
 Oenopota graphica (Locard, 1897)
 Oliva flammulata dolicha Locard, 1897
 Pagodula cossmanni (Locard, 1897)
 Pedicularia decurvata Locard, 1897
 Periapta polygyrella (P. Fischer in Locard, 1897)
 Relichna simplex (Locard, 1897)
 Ringicula pirulina Locard, 1897
 Spirotropis monterosatoi (Locard, 1897)
 Stylopsis marioni Locard, 1897
 Timbellus leucas (Locard, 1897)
 Turbonilla atlantica (Locard, 1897)
 Turbonilla pauperata Locard, 1897
 Volvarina cernita (Locard, 1897)

1898
 Bathysciadium costulatum (Locard, 1898)
 Calliostoma milneedwardsi (Locard, 1898)
 Calliostoma obesulum (Locard, 1898)
 Capulus simplex Locard, 1898
 Cardiomya striolata (Locard, 1898)
 Cetoconcha transversa (Locard, 1898)
 Cuspidaria semirostrata Locard, 1898
 Emarginula elata Locard, 1898
 Emarginula intervecta Locard, 1898
 Gibbula corallioides Locard, 1898
 Halicardia carinifera (Locard, 1898)
 Hyalopecten parvulinus (Locard, 1898)
 Megaxinus appendiculatus (Locard, 1898)
 Nuculana vestita (Locard, 1898)
 Panacca africana (Locard, 1898)
 Policordia densicostata (Locard, 1898)
 Rhinoclama nitens (Locard, 1898)
 Solariella cingulima (Locard, 1898)
 Solariella effossima Locard, 1898
 Solariella mogadorensis (Locard, 1898)
 Solariella rudecta (Locard, 1898)
 Talochlamys abscondita (P. Fischer in Locard, 1898)
 Turcicula miranda (Locard, 1898)
 Vertambitus triangularis (Locard, 1898)
 Verticordia triangularis Locard, 1898

1899
 Planktomya prima (Locard, 1899)

1900
 Gibberula turgidula (Locard & Caziot, 1900)
 Mangelia difficilis (Locard & Caziot, 1900)
 Philbertia atropurpurea (Locard & Caziot, 1900)
 Raphitoma atropurpurea (Locard & Caziot, 1900)
 Raphitoma cylindracea (Locard & Caziot, 1900)

1902
 Bythinella padiraci Locard, 1902

Named in honor 
Taxa named in honor of Arnould Locard include:
 Aphanitoma locardi Bavay, 1906
 Panacca locardi (Dall, 1903)

References

External links 

 
 Prodrome de malacologie française. Catalogue général des mollusques vivants de France. Mollusque marins 
 Sociétés savantes de France (biography and extensive bibliography)

1841 births
1904 deaths
French naturalists
French malacologists
French geologists
Scientists from Lyon
Members of Société géologique de France